Elschnitztalbach is a river of Thuringia, Germany, a tributary of the Sorbitz.

See also
List of rivers of Thuringia

Rivers of Thuringia
Rivers of Germany